Norcamphor is an organic compound, classified as a bicyclic ketone. It is an analog of camphor, but without the three methyl groups.  A colorless solid, it is used as a building block in organic synthesis.  Norcamphor is prepared from norbornene via the 2-formate ester, which is oxidized.  It is a useful precursor to norborneols.

See also
 Norbornane

References

Ketones
Cyclopentanes
Norbornanes